Frédéric Perez (born July 19, 1961 in Oran, French Algeria) is a French handball player who competed in the 1992 Summer Olympics.

He played handball for the French team that won the bronze medal in 1992. He participated in five games as the keeper.

External links

1961 births
Living people
French male handball players
Olympic handball players of France
Handball players at the 1992 Summer Olympics
Olympic bronze medalists for France
Olympic medalists in handball
Medalists at the 1992 Summer Olympics